A stomp box (or stompbox) is a percussion instrument consisting of a small box placed under the foot, which is tapped or stamped on rhythmically to produce a sound similar to that of a bass drum.  A stomp box allows a performer such as a singer or guitar player to create a simple rhythmic self-accompaniment.  Stompboxes are most commonly used in American folk and blues music, but they are also used across the musical spectrum.

There are commercially produced stomp boxes available, but performers often simply mount a dynamic microphone inside whatever wooden box they have handy. Some homemade stomp boxes include customized features such as a built-in preamp or equalizer.

In 2010s-era use, a simple piezo transducer (or sometimes a microphone) is located inside the box to allow amplification of the stompbox's bass sound through the PA system or bass amplifier. Other stompboxes such as the PorchBoard Bass and the Peterman acoustic use magnetic sensors designed to produce low-end frequencies.

Players
 John Hartford did not employ a stomp box, but used "a variety of props such as plywood squares and boards with sand and gravel on which to stomp, kick, and scrape to create natural and organic background noises" as well as "amplified plywood for tapping his feet" both in the studio and in live performance.
 Seasick Steve uses a self-made stomp box he named the Mississippi Drum Machine.
 Pete Flood
 Nathan Rogers
 Xavier Rudd
 John Lee Hooker did not use a stomp box, instead "stomping on a wooden pallet in time with the music."
 Jamie Cullum
 Jeff Lang
 Harry Manx
 Bob Malone
 Ash Grunwald
 Jon Boden uses "a large wooden box containing a microphone and made to sound like a kick drum—an idea he … borrowed from singer-songwriter Rory McLeod."
 Chris Woods (guitarist) had a stomp box made by Logarhythm, the "Chris Woods Signature Pro-log"
 John Butler

Gallery

See also
Cajón
Effects unit
Foot drum
Electronic tuner
Trigger pad

References

Struck idiophones
Foot percussion